The Simko Shikak revolt refers to an armed Ottoman-backed tribal Kurdish uprising against the Qajar dynasty of Iran from 1918 to 1922, led by Kurdish chieftain Simko Shikak from the Shekak tribe.

After Brigadier-General Reza Khan deposed the Qajars in a 1921 coup, he defeated Simko Shikak as well as several prominent rebel commanders such as Kuchik Khan and Colonel Pessian during the Iranian events of 1921. The Shikak rebellion resulted in some 5,000 killed, including many Assyrian civilians, who were massacred by Simko's forces.

History

Revolt
By summer 1918, Simko had established his authority over the regions west of Lake Urmia. In 1919, Simko organized an army of 20,000 Kurds and managed to secure a self-governed area in northwestern Iran, centered in the city of Urmia. Simko's forces had been reinforced with several hundred soldiers and mercenaries from the Ottoman Empire, including Kurdish deserters and nationalists. After taking over Urmia, Simko appointed Teymur Agha Shikak as the governor of the city. Later, he organized his forces to fight the Iranian army in the region and managed to expand the area under his control to the nearby towns and cities such as Mahabad, Khoy, Miandoab, Maku and Piranshahr in a series of battles.

In the battle of Gulmakhana, Kurdish forces under the command of Simko Shikak took control over Gulmakhana and the Urmia-Tabriz road from Iranian forces. In the battle of Shekar Yazi, the commander of the Iranian Army, General Amir Ershad, was killed. In the battle of Miandoab, Reza Shah, dispatched Khaloo Qurban to counter Kurdish expansion, but he was defeated and killed by Simko's forces in 1922. In the battle for the conquest of Mahabad (then named Savoujbolagh Mokri), Simko himself commanded his forces with the help of Seyyed Taha Shamzini. After a tough battle in October 1921, Iranian forces were defeated and their commander Major Malakzadeh along with 600 Iranian Gendarmeries was killed. Simko also conquered Maragheh and encouraged the Lurs tribes of western Iran to revolt.

At this time, the government in Tehran tried to reach an agreement with Simko on the basis of limited Kurdish autonomy. Simko had further organized a Kurdish army, which grew stronger and stronger. Since the central government could not control his activities, he continued to expand the areas of western Iran under his control. By 1922, the cities of Baneh and Sardasht were under his administration.

In the battle of sari Taj in 1922, Simko's forces could not resist the Iranian Army's onslaught in the region of Salmas and were finally defeated and the castle of Chari, where Simko's forces were camping, was occupied. The strength of the Iranian Army force dispatched against Simko was 10,000 soldiers. Simko and one thousand of his mounted soldiers, took refuge in what was now Turkey, where they were forced to lay down their weapons.

Aftermath
By 1926, Simko had regained control of his tribe and begun the another rebellion. When the army engaged him, half of his troops betrayed him to the tribe's previous leader and Simko fled to Iraq.

In 1930, the commander of the Iranian Army, General Hassan Muqaddam sent a letter to Simko, who was residing in the village of Barzan, and invited him for a meeting in the town of Oshnaviyeh. After consulting with his friends, Simko along with Khorshid Agha Harki went to Oshnaviyeh and were invited to the house of the local army commander, Colonel Norouzi, and were told to wait for the Iranian general. Colonel Norouzi convinced Simko to go to the outskirts of the town to welcome the general's arrival. However, this was a trap, and Simko was ambushed and killed on the evening of June 30, 1930.

Foreign involvement
The Iranian government accused Britain and Iraq of encouraging unrest amongst the Kurds, and deeply resented the asylum given by the Iraqi government to Simko in 1922 and to Sardār Rashid in 1923.

According to an article published by The New York Times on July 10, 1922:

Simko's forces joined with the Ottoman forces in reportedly killing many of the escaping Christians in West Azerbaijan.

Legacy
Simko's revolts are seen by some as an attempt by a powerful tribal chief to establish his personal authority over the central government throughout the region. Although elements of Kurdish nationalism were present in this movement, historians agree these were hardly articulate enough to justify a claim that recognition of Kurdish identity was a major issue in Simko's movement. It lacked any kind of administrative organization and Simko was primarily interested in plunder. Government forces and non-Kurds were not the only ones to suffer in the attacks, the Kurdish population was also robbed and assaulted. Simko's men do not appear to have felt any sense of unity or solidarity with fellow Kurds. In the words of Kurdologist and Iranologist Garnik Asatrian:  On the other hand, Reza Shah's military victory over Simko and Turkic tribal leaders initiated a repressive era toward non-Persian minorities. In a nationalistic perspective, Simko's revolt is described as an attempt to build a Kurdish tribal alliance in support of independence. According to the political scientist Hamid Ahmadi:

See also
Timeline of Kurdish uprisings
List of modern conflicts in the Middle East

References

Kurdish rebellions in Iran
1919 in Iran
1920 in Iran
1921 in Iran
1922 in Iran
Conflicts in 1919
Conflicts in 1920
Conflicts in 1921
Conflicts in 1922
Iran–Turkey relations
Assyrian genocide
Iranian Kurdistan
Mass murder in 1918
Qajar Iran